Raphaël Adicéam (born 3 July 1990) is a French professional footballer who plays as a goalkeeper for Championnat National 2 club Beauvais.

Career 
While playing for Amiens, Adicéam made his professional debut in a 2–1 Coupe de la Ligue loss to Clermont on 9 August 2016.

On 3 January 2022, Adicéam signed for Championnat National 2 side Beauvais.

References 

1990 births
Living people
Sportspeople from Argenteuil
French footballers
Association football goalkeepers
Entente SSG players
FCM Aubervilliers players
Amiens SC players
Racing Club de France Football players
Red Star F.C. players
AS Beauvais Oise players
Championnat National 2 players
Championnat National 3 players
Championnat National players
Footballers from Val-d'Oise